The Monastery of Saint Thaddeus (Surb Tadeosi vank; , Kelisā-ye Tādeus moghadas) is an ancient Armenian monastery in the mountainous area of West Azerbaijan Province, Iran. It is believed to be one of the oldest church buildings in the world.

Also known as Gara Kilise (translated from Azerbaijani as "Black Church") (Qare Kelisā), it is located about 20 kilometers from the town of Chaldiran.  The monastery and its distinctive Armenian conical roofs are visible from long distances.

The Monastery is site of the Pilgrimage of St. Thaddeus which in 2020 was added by UNESCO to its list of Intangible Cultural Heritage.

History and architecture 

According to the tradition of the Armenian Apostolic Church, Saint Thaddeus, also known as Saint Jude, (not to be confused with Judas Iscariot), evangelized the region of Armenia and Persia. According to Moses of Khorenatsi, an Armenian historian writing in the 5th century, Thaddeus suffered martyrdom in Armenia under King Sanatruk, and is revered as an apostle of the Armenian Church. Legend has it that a church dedicated to him was first built on the present site, also the site of his tomb, in AD 66, with another source placing the fondation in AD 239 by St. Gregory the Illuminator. Another tradition states that Thaddeus built a monastery at the site for his followers, who buried him there upon his death. The exact date of construction is unknown.

The monastery was damaged in 1231, during the Mongol invasion of the Persian Empire, and again in 1242.

Little remains of the monastery's original structure, as it was extensively rebuilt after an earthquake damaged it in 1319, during which 75 monks died.  Nevertheless, some of the parts surrounding the altar apse date from the 7th century.

Much of the present structure dates from 1811, when the Qajar prince Abbas Mirza aided renovations and repairs. Simeon, Father Superior of the monastery, added a large narthex-like western extension to the church.

The western extension duplicates the design of Etchmiadzin Cathedral, the mother church of the Armenian Apostolic Church. The 19th century additions were constructed from ashlar sandstone. The earliest sections are of black and white stone. 

In July 2008, the Monastery of Saint Thaddeus was added to UNESCO's World Heritage List, along with two other Armenian monuments in the same province: the Monastery of Saint Stepanos and the Chapel of Dzordzor.

Notable details

Apostles Thaddeus and Bartholomew 
According to Armenian Church tradition, the Apostles Thaddeus and Bartholomew traveled through Armenia in AD 45 to preach the word of God, where many people were converted and numerous secret Christian communities were established.

The ancient Christian historian Moses of Khorene told the following story, considered a legend by most modern historiographers.
Thaddeus converted King Abgar V of Edessa. After his death, the Armenian kingdom was split into two parts. His son Ananun crowned himself in Edessa, while his nephew Sanatruk ruled in Armenia. About AD 66, Ananun gave the order to kill Saint Thaddeus in Edessa. The king's daughter Sandokht, who had converted to Christianity, was martyred with Thaddeus. Her tomb is said to be located near the Qara Kelisa.

Events 
The annual ceremony and pilgrimage in the St. Thaddeus Monastery was held 14-16 July 2016. It was held by the Armenian Diocese of Atrpatakan. In December 2020, UNESCO added the pilgrimage to its list of Intangible Cultural Heritage.

Gallery

See also 

 Chapel of Dzordzor
 Saint Bartholomew Monastery
 Saint Stepanos Monastery
 Vaspurakan

References

External links 

 UNESCO World Heritage: Armenian Monastic Ensembles of Iran
 Thaddeus Monastery at Armeniapedia
 St Thaddeus at Armenica.org
 Armenian Architecture studies
 Hamid-Rezā Hosseini, Sound of the Ancient Bell, in Persian, Jadid Online, October 31, 2008, آواى ناقوس کهن | جدید آنلاین A shorter English version: Iran's World Heritage Monastery, Jadid Online, December 25, 2008: Iran’s World Heritage Monastery | جدید آنلاینSlide show (with English subtitles): Untitled Document (5 min 41 sec)

Buildings and structures completed in 1329
Christian monasteries established in the 14th century
Armenian Apostolic monasteries in Iran
Armenian Apostolic churches in Iran
World Heritage Sites in Iran
History of West Azerbaijan Province
Buildings and structures in West Azerbaijan Province
Tourist attractions in West Azerbaijan Province
Vaspurakan
Intangible Cultural Heritage of Humanity